Rebecca Mead (born 24 September 1966) is an English writer and journalist.

Early life and education
Rebecca Mead was born in London, England. When she was three years old she relocated with her family to the seaside town of Weymouth in Dorset, where she grew up. Mead's father was a civil servant. As a teenager she became interested in left-wing politics.

Mead studied English literature at the University of Oxford.

After graduating from Oxford she won a full scholarship to study for a master's degree in journalism at New York University.

Career 
While at NYU, Mead was employed as an intern by New York Magazine. After graduation the magazine employed her as a fact checker. After a few years she was promoted to features writer. She joined The New Yorker as a staff writer in 1997.

Mead published My Life In Middlemarch (The Road to Middlemarch in the UK) in 2014. A personal study of George Eliot's best-known novel, it received mixed reviews.

Personal life 
Mead was naturalised as an American citizen in 2011 and moved back to the United Kingdom in 2018.

Bibliography

Books
 
 
 
Chapters

Essays, reporting and other contributions 
 
 
 
 
 
 
 
 
 
 
 
 
 
 
 
 
 
 

———————
Notes

References

English journalists
1966 births
Writers from London
People from Weymouth, Dorset
Alumni of the University of Oxford
New York University alumni
Living people
People with acquired American citizenship
The New Yorker staff writers
English emigrants to the United States